Thural was one of the 68 assembly constituencies of Himachal Pradesh a northern Indian state. Thural was also part of Kangra Lok Sabha constituency.

Member of Legislative Assembly

 1977: Gian Chand, Janata Party
 1982: Chandresh Kumari Katoch, Indian National Congress
 1985: Durga Chand, Lok Dal
 1990: Kanwar Durga Chand, Janata Dal

Election results

2007

See also

 Thural
 Kangra district
 Kangra (Lok Sabha constituency)

References

Kangra district
Former assembly constituencies of Himachal Pradesh